Sanhe Subdistrict is a subdistrict in and the seat of Sandu Shui Autonomous County in southeastern Guizhou province, China. , it has 5 residential communities and 5 villages under its administration.

References

Subdistricts of Guizhou
Sandu Shui Autonomous County